The Living Bible (TLB or LB) is a personal paraphrase, not a translation, of the Bible  in English by Kenneth N. Taylor and first published in 1971. Taylor used the American Standard Version of 1901 as his base text.

Origin 
In a 1979 interview by Harold Myra in an issue of Christianity Today, Taylor explained the inspiration for preparing The Living Bible:

The children were one of the chief inspirations for producing the Living Bible. Our family devotions were tough going because of the difficulty we had understanding the King James Version, which we were then using, or the Revised Standard Version, which we used later. All too often I would ask questions to be sure the children understood, and they would shrug their shoulders—they didn't know what the passage was talking about. So I would explain it. I would paraphrase it for them and give them the thought. It suddenly occurred to me one afternoon that I should write out the reading for that evening thought by thought, rather than doing it on the spot during our devotional time. So I did, and read the chapter to the family that evening with exciting results—they knew the answers to all the questions I asked!

Reception 
The Living Bible was well received in many Evangelical circles. Youth-oriented Protestant groups such as Youth for Christ and Young Life accepted it readily.  In 1962 Billy Graham received a copy of Living Letters – a paraphrase of the  New Testament epistles and the first portion of what later became The Living Bible – while recuperating in a hospital in Hawaii.  He was impressed with its easy readability, and he asked for permission to print 50,000 paperback copies of Living Letters for use in his evangelistic crusades. Over the next year he distributed 600,000 copies of Living Letters.

There is also The Catholic Living Bible, which holds an imprimatur and nihil obstat from the Catholic Church and contains the deuterocanonical books as well as an introduction entitled "Why Read The Bible?" by Pope John Paul II. The Catholic Living Bible does not use the word "paraphrased" on the front cover; instead it places the word on the title page, underneath which is written "A Thought-For-Thought Translation". The added words "A Thought-For-Thought Translation" in the subtitle of the title page are not unique to Catholic editions, they are also in the later printings of the Protestant editions, even though the Bible is a paraphrase.

The Living Bible was a best-seller in the early 1970s, largely due to the accessibility of its modern language, which made passages understandable to those with weak reading skills, or no previous background in Bible study. The Living Bible was the best-selling book in the U.S.a

From the very beginning of its publication, Taylor had assigned the copyright to Tyndale House Foundation, so all of the royalties from sales of The Living Bible were given to charity.

Criticism 
Michael Marlowe criticized the edition, saying that it was "the dumbing-down of the Biblical text to a grade-school level" done "in keeping with the linguistic and educational trends of the time." He adds that "very few scholars have given any encouragement to its [The Living Bible] use, and most have either ignored it or have strictly warned against it." Moreover, he claims that the text of The Living Bible contains "venturesome interpretations that no scholar is likely to approve" and that "[i]n several places Taylor brazenly wrests the scripture so as to conform it to Arminian teachings about salvation."

Textual characteristics 
The Living Bible uses modern language, which made passages understandable to those with weak reading skills, or no previous background in Bible study, and lingual contractions such as "don't" for "do not".

In the late 1980s, Taylor and his colleagues at Tyndale House Publishers invited a team of 90 Greek and Hebrew scholars to participate in a project of revising the text of The Living Bible. After many years of work, the result was an entirely new translation of the Bible. It was published in 1996 as the Holy Bible: New Living Translation (NLT).

Notable passages
At 1 Samuel 24:3, The Living Bible has "Saul went into the cave to go to the bathroom", using a contemporary North American euphemism where the original Hebrew (also a euphemism) literally translates as "to cover his feet". In the British edition of The Living Bible, this wording was changed to "to relieve himself", which is also found in most other non-literal English translations.

Notes

References

1971 books
1971 in Christianity
Bible translations into English
Biblical paraphrases